UFC Fight Night: Lauzon vs. Stephens (also known as UFC Fight Night 17) was a mixed martial arts event held by the Ultimate Fighting Championship (UFC) on February 7, 2009.

Background
The main event was originally scheduled to be between Joe Lauzon and Hermes Franca. However, Franca suffered a torn ACL during training and could no longer participate in this event.  He was replaced by Jeremy Stephens.

Derek Downey replaced Amir Sadollah in a bout against Nick Catone.  Sadollah pulled out after being sidelined with a broken clavicle.

Dan Miller replaced Alessio Sakara in a bout against Jake Rosholt.  Sakara pulled out of the bout with a shoulder injury.

Matt Veach replaced George Sotiropoulos against Matt Grice.  Sotiropoulos suffered a rib injury.

Results

Bonus awards
Fighters were awarded $30,000 bonuses.

 Fights of the Night: Mac Danzig vs. Josh Neer
 Knockout of the Night: Cain Velasquez
 Submission of the Night: Joe Lauzon

See also
 Ultimate Fighting Championship
 List of UFC champions
 List of UFC events
 2009 in UFC

References

UFC Fight Night
2009 in mixed martial arts
Events in Tampa, Florida
Mixed martial arts in Florida
Sports competitions in Tampa, Florida
2009 in sports in Florida
21st century in Tampa, Florida